Opatów  is a village in the administrative district of Gmina Łęka Opatowska, within Kępno County, Greater Poland Voivodeship, in west-central Poland.

The village has a population of 1,200.

Notable residents
Friederike Kempner (1836-1904), German-Jewish poet

References

Villages in Kępno County